A hobby is a fairly small, very swift falcon with long, narrow wings. There are four birds called "hobby", and some others which, although termed "falcon", are very similar. All specialise in being superb aerialists. Although they take prey on the ground if the opportunity presents itself, most prey is caught on the wing; insects are often caught by hawking, and many different birds are caught in flight, where even the quick maneuvering swifts and swallows cannot escape a hobby.

The typical hobbies are traditionally considered a subgenus, Hypotriorchis, due to their similar morphology; they have ample amounts of dark slaty grey in their plumage; the malar area is black; and the underside usually has lengthwise black streaks. The tails are all-dark or have only slight bands.

Monophyly of Hypotriorchis is supported by DNA sequence data, though the exact limits of the group are still uncertain. The hobbies seem to be one of the Falco lineages which emerged around the Miocene-Pliocene boundary some 8-5 million years ago and subsequently radiated - in this case throughout the Old World. Their relationship to the peregrine falcon group and the kestrels is not well resolved, however; taxa such as the red-footed falcon appear in some respects intermediate between the kestrels and the typical hobbies.
 Eurasian hobby (F. subbuteo), also known as the northern hobby
 African hobby (F. cuvierii)
 Oriental hobby (F. severus)
 Australian hobby or little falcon (F. longipennis), uncommon but widespread in Australia, during the southern winter, some birds migrate to the north of the continent or to the islands of Southeast Asia
 Sooty falcon (F. concolor) of the North African desert
 Eleonora's falcon (F. eleonorae) occupies the Mediterranean area during the northern summer, and migrates south to Madagascar for the southern summer.

These species are tentatively placed here:
 New Zealand falcon or karearea (F. novaeseelandiae).
 Brown falcon (F. berigora)
 Taita falcon (F. fasciinucha)

References

Falcons

de:Baumfalke
fr:Falco subbuteo